Carl Sanford Joslyn "Sandy" Petersen (born September 16, 1955) is an American game designer. He worked at Chaosium, contributing to the development of RuneQuest and later creating the acclaimed and influential horror role-playing game Call of Cthulhu. He would later  join id Software where he would work on the development of the Doom franchise and Quake.

Biography
Petersen was born in St. Louis, Missouri and developed the love for dinosaurs at age 3. He studied paleontology in college and later attended University of California, Berkeley, majoring in zoology.

Work

Chaosium
He is a well-known fan of H. P. Lovecraft, whose work he first encountered in a World War II Armed Services Edition of The Dunwich Horror and other Weird Tales found in his father's library. In 1974, Dungeons & Dragons brought his interest to role-playing games. He became a full-time staff member at Chaosium. His interest for role-playing games and H. P. Lovecraft were fused when he became principal author of Chaosium's game Call of Cthulhu, published 1981, and many scenarios and background pieces thereafter. While working for Chaosium he co-authored the third edition of RuneQuest, for which he also co-wrote the critically acclaimed Trollpak and a number of other Gloranthan supplements.

He authored several critically acclaimed RuneQuest supplements for Avalon Hill and Games Workshop. Petersen served as co-designer for West End Games's Ghostbusters roleplaying game. He still plays and runs role-playing games, and is a frequent guest at conventions where he usually runs a freeform game of his own devising, and/or helps to run someone else's game.

MicroProse
He worked some time for MicroProse, where he is credited for work on Sid Meier's Pirates! and Sword of the Samurai. Between 1989 and 1992 he also worked on the video games Darklands, Hyperspeed, and Lightspeed. He also made some contributions to Civilization. Petersen was laid off in 1992 and was jobless for 5 months. He considered that period as one of the worst times of his life.

id Software
Primarily interested by the first-person shooter Wolfenstein 3D, Petersen joined id Software about 10 weeks before the December 1993 release of Doom and in that time created 19 levels for it (of which 8 were based to some extent on early drafts by Tom Hall). He later created 17 of the levels for Doom II, and 7 levels for Quake. His Lovecraftian influences also resulted in some changes to the monster designs for these games.

Ensemble Studios
He left id Software for Ensemble Studios in June 1997. There, he has worked as a game designer on several of their Age of Empires titles, including Rise of Rome, Age of Kings, and The Conquerors. During this time, he was a frequent poster on the HeavenGames forums under the username ES_Sandyman. He ran an extremely popular series of threads, "Ask Sandyman", where forum members could ask him about anything they wanted.

Recent works
Petersen was the Executive Producer for the 2011 movie The Whisperer in Darkness which was nominated for awards at the Chicago and Warsaw International Film Festivals. It was produced by H.P. Lovecraft Historical Society Motion Pictures in the style of a 1930s black and white horror movie.

In April 2011 he served as the publisher of horror magazine Arcane: Penny Dreadfuls for the 21st Century.

Petersen took a professorship at The Guildhall at SMU in 2009 following the closure of Ensemble Studios, where he taught several courses on game design.

Petersen worked at Barking Lizards Technologies as their Creative Director, after leaving The Guildhall, and worked on their iOS release, Osiris Legends.

In mid-2013 Petersen led a highly successful Kickstarter campaign by his company, Green Eye Games, to produce the Cthulhu Wars boardgame. Over US$1,400,000 was raised achieving over 3,500% of the initial target.  This success allowed the creation of more figures (60), map expansions and additional scenario options. In most, if not all, previous Cthulhu games "you strive to avert the impending catastrophe. But in Cthulhu Wars you ARE the catastrophe! The Great Old Ones have returned to claim the ruins of Earth, and you are one of them!" Green Eye Games also produced the unsuccessful kickstarter Cthulhu World Combat (iOS, Android, Windows, PSN, Xbox Live).

In June 2015, it was announced that Petersen and Greg Stafford had returned to Chaosium Inc. He left the board in 2019.

Personal life 
Petersen is a practicing member of the Church of Jesus Christ of Latter-day Saints, but sees no conflict between his faith and his design of games involving Satanic elements. While working on Doom, he said to John Romero, "I have no problems with the demons in the game. They're just cartoons. And, anyway, they're the bad guys."

Sandy is married, has five children, and 15 grandchildren.

Credits

Video games
 Sid Meier's Pirates! (1989)
 Civilization (1991)
 Lightspeed (1990)
 Hyperspeed (1991)
 Darklands (1992)
 DOOM (1993)
 Doom II: Hell on Earth (1994)
 The Ultimate DOOM (1995)
 Quake (1996)
 Hexen: Beyond Heretic (1996)
 Final DOOM (1996)
 Quake II (1997, uncredited)
 Age of Empires (1997)
 Age of Empires: The Rise of Rome (1998)
 Age of Empires II (1999)
 Age of Empires II: The Conquerors (2000)
 Age of Empires III (2005)
 Age of Empires III: The WarChiefs (2006)
 Halo Wars (2009)
 Osiris Legends (2011)

Role-playing games
 Call of Cthulhu (1981)
 Ghostbusters  (1986)

Board games
 Cthulhu Wars (2015)
 Theomachy (2016)
 Orcs Must Die! (2016)
 Castle Dicenstein (2017)
 Evil High Priest (2018)
 The Gods War (2018)
 Hyperspace (2019)
 Planet Apocalypse (2020)

Films
 The Whisperer In Darkness (2011)

See also
Dragon

References

External links
 Ask Sandy Series @ Age of Kings Heaven (1999-2001)
 GameSpy interview (2002)
 yog-sothoth.com interview
 
 MobyGames biography
 The Guildhall @ SMU Homepage
  An interview in Italian language on RiLL.it (2011)
 

1955 births
Living people
American media critics
American video game designers
American Latter Day Saints
Artists from St. Louis
Chaosium game designers
Cthulhu Mythos writers
Role-playing game designers
Id Software people
MicroProse people
University of California, Berkeley alumni
Video game critics